Chooks is an English/Australian/New Zealand idiom for chickens.

Chook or chooks may also refer to:

 Chook Sibtain (born 1969), English actor
 Charles "Chook" Fraser (1893–1981), Australian rugby league footballer
 Chooks Fresh & Tasty, a Western Australian fast food chain

See also
 
 Chooka (disambiguation)